Victoria Alcock (born 13 May 1968) is a British actress.

Notable roles
Alcock played the prisoner Julie Saunders in all eight series of the television drama series, Bad Girls and Agnes Clarke in The House of Eliott. In January 2012, Alcock was cast as Lorraine Stevens (née Salter), the ex-prostitute mother of Mandy Salter (Nicola Stapleton), in the BBC soap opera EastEnders, reviving the role from Linda Henry, who starred as Salter until 1992. Her first episode was broadcast on 1 March.

Alcock appeared in the 2009 Easter Special Doctor Who episode titled Planet of the Dead, playing Angela Whittaker alongside the Tenth Doctor (played by David Tennant). She also appeared alongside the Sixth Doctor (played by Colin Baker) on the Doctor Who Lost Story audio titled Power Play, playing Marion Tudor (who disliked being called "Mary"), a leading protestor against a controversial nuclear power plant.

Filmography

Film

Television

References

External links

Living people
1965 births
British film actresses
British television actresses
Actresses from London
British soap opera actresses